Catharina Pietersdr Hooft (28 December 1618 – 30 September 1691) was a woman of the Dutch Golden Age.  She became famous at a very early age, when she was painted by Frans Hals.

At the age of sixteen she married Cornelis de Graeff, nineteen years her senior and the most powerful regent and mayor of Amsterdam. Thus she became first lady of Soestdijk, one of the family's country houses. Catharina Hooft was also a Lady of the High and free Fief of Purmerland and Ilpendam.

Life

 

Catharina Hooft was born in Amsterdam. Her father, Pieter Jansz Hooft, was a nephew of the Amsterdam mayor Cornelis Pietersz. Hooft and related to the renowned P. C. Hooft of the Muiderslot – a wealthy patrician. Her mother, Geertruid Overlander (sister of Volkert Overlander), was forty-one and she and her husband had given up hope of having children when Catharina was born. On 14 August 1635, at the age of sixteen, Catharina married Cornelis de Graeff, an older widower, whose first wife had been Catharina's cousin (her father's sister's child). The couple had themselves painted in princely fashion, in black with golden chains. Catharina bore two sons: Pieter and Jacob. When stadholder William II died in 1650, ten years later followed by his wife, Cornelis de Graeff was made one of the guardians of the ten-year-old William, the "child of state", who played with Catharina's sons. By the Act of Seclusion William was not allowed to accede and power remained in the regent's hands.

Opposite the De Graeffs' house lived the powerful anti-Orangist Bicker family, consisting of Catharina’s brother-in-law and sister-in-law and their four daughters, one of whom - Wendela Bicker - married Catharina’s nephew, raadspensionaris Jan de Witt.

Catharina was widowed in 1664 and when, in 1672, William stepped out of the shadows to become general and stadholder, she changed political tack and – with her sons – became a supporter of the House of Orange.  William bought the de Graeff hunting lodge and its surrounding fields, the later Soestdijk Palace, from Jacob de Graeff for only 18,755 guilders. In 1678 Catharina inherited the high Lordship of Purmerland and Ilpendam from her cousin Maria Overlander van Purmerland, which she owned half with her son Jacob, who was also Maria's full nephew. Catharina outlived her husband for thirty years. She died in Ilpendam and was buried in Amsterdam on October 6, 1691.

Literature
 Graeff, P. de (P. de Graeff Gerritsz en Dirk de Graeff van Polsbroek) Genealogie van de familie De Graeff van Polsbroek, Amsterdam 1882.
 Bruijn, J. H. de Genealogie van het geslacht De Graeff van Polsbroek 1529/1827, met bijlagen. De Built 1962–63.
 Moelker, H. P. De heerlijkheid Purmerland en Ilpendam (1978 Purmerend)

External links and Commons

 Catharina Hooft at Heren van Holland (nl)
 Catharina Hooft at Vrouwen van Soestdijk
 Stamboomdelen Hooft (nl)

1618 births
1691 deaths
House De Graeff
17th-century Dutch women
Nobility from Amsterdam
Lords of Purmerland and Ilpendam
Burials at the Oude Kerk, Amsterdam
Frans Hals